A Gnome Named Gnorm (also known in some markets as Upworld) is a 1990 fantasy buddy comedy film directed by Stan Winston and written by Pen Densham and John Watson. The film stars Anthony Michael Hall, Jerry Orbach and Claudia Christian, and is about a Los Angeles police detective who teams up with a gnome to solve a murder.

Plot
Gnorm is just an average gnome (a tunneler) who lives underground, but he wants to impress a lady gnome by doing something heroic. So he takes the lumen, a stone that must be brought to the surface (called Upworld by the gnomes) to be exposed to the sun to recharge it. When he gets to the surface, he witnesses a murder and the killer ends up with the lumen. Detective Casey (Hall), who was working a sting operation with the murdered man, is blamed for botching the sting, and the man's death. Wanting to catch the killer to clear his name, he teams up with Gnorm, whom he accidentally discovers. He is going to need his partner Samantha's (Christian) help, but she thinks he is a nut. See, no one else knows about Gnorm.

Cast
 Anthony Michael Hall as Detective Casey Gallagher
 Jerry Orbach as Captain Stan Walton
 Claudia Christian as Detective Samantha
 Eli Danker as Zadar
 Mark Harelik as Detective Kaminsky
 Robert Z'Dar as Reggie
 Pat Crawford Brown as Female Mourner
 Joseph R. Sicari as Ferril
 Greg Kean as Budd
 Michelle Johnston as Stripper
 Wren T. Brown as Hearse Driver
 Rueben Grundy as Cop #1
 Guy Garner as Cop #2
 Gnorm is played by several actors, and is voiced by Rob Paulsen

Production
The movie was filmed under the title Upworld in 46 days, and was completed in early 1989, except for the ending. Winston termed the original poignant scenes the “big finale,” but said that after screening the film with a live audience he decided to change to a more humorous ending. Due to the bankruptcy of Vestron Pictures, the film wound up in limbo without experiencing a major release.

References

External links

1990 films
1990 comedy films
1990s fantasy comedy films
American buddy cop films
American fantasy comedy films
Fictional portrayals of the Los Angeles Police Department
Films about gnomes
Films directed by Stan Winston
Puppet films
Films set in Los Angeles
Films shot in Los Angeles
Films scored by Richard Gibbs
PolyGram Filmed Entertainment films
Films produced by Scott Kroopf
1990s English-language films
1990s American films